August Kalkmann (24 March 1853, in Hamburg – 19 February 1905, in Berlin) was a German classical archaeologist and art historian.

He studied under Franz Bücheler, Hermann Usener and Reinhard Kekulé von Stradonitz at the University of Bonn, receiving his doctorate in 1881 with a dissertation on Euripides' Hippolytus. In 1885 he qualified as a lecturer, and in 1900 became an associate professor at the University of Berlin.

Principal works 
 De Hippolytis Euripideis quaestiones novae, 1881 (dissertation).
 Über Darstellungen der Hippolytos-Sage, 1883 – Representations on the legend of Hippolytus.
 Pausanias der Perieget. Untersuchungen über seine Schriftstellerei und seine Quellen, 1886 – Pausanias the Periegete.
 Die Proportionen des Gesichts in der griechischen Kunst, 1893 – On proportions of the face in Greek art.
 Die Quellen der Kunstgeschichte der Plinius, 1898 – The source of art history of Pliny.
 August Kalkmanns nachgelassenes Werk, 1909 – August Kalkmann's posthumous work (edited by Hermann Voss).

References 

1853 births
1905 deaths
University of Bonn alumni
Academic staff of the Humboldt University of Berlin
German art historians
Archaeologists from Hamburg
German classical philologists